Kathleen MacInnes, or Caitlin NicAonghais in Scottish Gaelic, (born 30 December 1969) is a Scottish singer, who performs primarily in Scottish Gaelic. She is a native of South Uist, Outer Hebrides, Scotland, and lives in Glasgow with her partner and three sons. In 2010, she appeared on the soundtrack to the Ridley Scott film Robin Hood.

Discography

Solo albums
 Òg-Mhadainn Shamhraidh (Summer Dawn) (2006)
 Cille Bhrìde (Kilbride) (2012)

Collaborations and guest appearances
 Iain MacDonald & Iain MacFarlane – The First Harvest (2002)
 Maggie MacInnes – Òran na Mnà (A Woman's Song) (2006)
 Julie Fowlis – Cuilidh (2007)
 Griogair Labhruidh – Dail-riata (2007)
 Margaret Stewart  - Togaidh mi mo Sheòlta (2007)
 Deoch 'n' Dorus – The Curer (2008)
 Blair Douglas – Stay Strong (Bithibh Laidir / Rester Fort) (2008)
 Flying Fiddles – Flying Fiddles (2009)
 Marc Streitenfeld – Robin Hood (Soundtrack) (2010)
 Seudan – Seudan (2011)
 Salsa Celtica – The Tall Islands (2014)
 Niteworks – Maraiche (2015)
 Trail West – Rescattermastered (2016)

Filmography

Film
 An Ceasnachadh: The Interrogation of a Highland Lass (2000)
 Seachd: The Inaccessible Pinnacle (2007)

Television
 Speaking our Language (1992–1996)
 Machair (1992–1998)
 Bannan / The Ties that Bind (2014)
 Gaol @ Gael (2014)

Awards
 Scots Trad Music Awards: Gaelic Singer of the Year (2006)

References 

1969 births
Living people
Scottish folk singers
People from Uist
Scottish Gaelic singers